Yuri Suzuki may refer to:
 Yuri Suzuki (physicist)
 Yuri Suzuki (designer)